Alfred the Great (c. 849–899) was an English king.

Alfred the Great may also refer to:

Alfred (bishop) (died 943), Bishop of Sherborne
Alfred the Great (play), 1831 play by James Sheridan Knowles
Alfred the Great (film), 1969 film
Alfred the Great (comics), comic by Al Colombia